Jorge Boreis Tati (born 17 June 1983 in Buco Zau, Angola), is a professional Angolan basketball player. Tati, who is 195 cm (6'4") in height and weighs 91 kg (200 pounds), plays as a small forward. He competed for Angola at the 2011 FIBA Africa Championship.

He is currently playing for [[G.D. Física Torres Vedras. .

See also
 Angola national basketball team

References

External links
 2011 FIBA Africa Championship Stats
 AfricaBasket Profile
 RealGM Profile

1983 births
Living people
People from Cabinda Province
Angolan men's basketball players
Small forwards
C.D. Primeiro de Agosto men's basketball players
G.D. Interclube men's basketball players